Google's Advanced Technology and Projects group (ATAP) is a skunkworks team and in-house technology incubator, created by former DARPA director Regina Dugan. ATAP is similar to X, but works on projects, granting project leaders time—previously only two years—in which to move a project from concept to proven product. According to Dugan, the ideal ATAP project combines technology and science, requires a certain amount of novel research, and creates a marketable product.  Historically, the ATAP team was born at Motorola and kept when Google sold Motorola to Lenovo in 2014; for this reason, ATAP ideas have tended to involve mobile hardware technology.

The team embodies principles that former Google VP Dugan used at DARPA. One of these principles is to create small teams of high performers.  Another is to make use of resources outside the organizational box; ATAP has worked with hundreds of partners in more than twenty countries, including schools, corporations, startups, governments, and nonprofits.  Standing contracts are in place with a number of top-flight schools, such as Stanford, Berkeley, MIT, and Caltech, to facilitate rapid research arrangements when needed.

Projects 
Although ATAP has occasionally publicized the number of projects in progress, the individual projects are kept secret until they are nearing maturity and it's time to start developing public interest.  At that point, they have historically been announced at the annual Google I/O developer conference.  Some of the announced projects to date are described below.

Project Tango 

The Project Tango team was led by computer scientist Johnny Lee, a core contributor to Microsoft's Kinect.  Project Tango was a computer-vision technology that allows mobile devices to detect their position relative to the world around them, without requiring GPS or other external signals.  This enables the use of mobile phones and tablets for indoor navigation, 3D mapping, measurement of physical spaces, recognition of known environments, augmented reality, and windows into virtual 3D worlds.

In the first quarter of 2015, the team left ATAP and became a Google team in its own right, making Project Tango the first product to emerge from the intensive two-year incubator process.

Project Ara 

Project Ara is a platform for creating customizable, modular smartphones.  With Project Ara, consumers populate an electronic frame, called an endoskeleton or "endo", with rectangular hardware modules for power, processing, memory, screen, wireless, and other functionality.  Consumers assemble basic modules to create a working device, then add or remove additional modules as desired – in some cases, even while the device is operating.  Optional modules include cameras, speakers, large data storage, and medical sensors.  Since users can update individual modules when better technology becomes available, Project Ara provides a hedge against cyclical obsolescence.

It also reduces the purchase price of a low-end cell phone, by creating the option of buying only the most basic features.  This may support the spread of technology in economically-disadvantaged areas.  The official Project Ara website specifies a targeted manufacturing cost for an entry-level device in the $50-$100 range, and states that the project has "the goal of delivering the mobile internet to the next 5 billion people".  Google had targeted the first Project Ara public release for Puerto Rico in 2015, but announced that the test has been delayed until 2016.

A Project Ara Module Development Kit (MDK) will enable manufacturers to create Project Ara-compatible modules.  An early pre-release version of the MDK is available on the Project Ara website.  ATAP sponsored Project Ara Developer's Conferences in 2014 and 2015 to begin stimulating interest in the emerging hardware ecosystem and solicit input from potential designers and manufacturers.

Ara is an exception in that the usual ATAP two-year timeframe was extended to give more time for the project's completion.  However, at the time of the extension team leader Paul Eremenko was replaced by Rafa Camargo, named by CNET in 2015 as one of the Top 20 Latinos in Tech.

Project Soli 

Project Soli is a new gesture-recognition technology based on radar, unlike established approaches based on visual or infrared light such as stereo cameras, structured light, or time-of-flight sensors.  This novel approach, which uses small, high-speed sensors and data-analysis techniques such as Doppler, can detect fine motions with sub-millimeter accuracy.  Thus, for instance, Project Soli technology enables a user to issue commands to a computer by rubbing a thumb and forefinger together in pre-defined patterns.  Applications might include sensors embedded in clothing, switches that don't require physical contact, and accessibility technology.

The project is headed by Ivan Poupyrev, a former scientist for Disney Imagineering who was named one of Fast Company's "100 Most Creative People in Business 2013".  Project Soli was announced at Google I/O 2015 and generated considerable media interest.  According to the official site, in 2015 the team was preparing to make an alpha Project Soli development kit available to a limited number of developers, with plans for signing people up for a larger beta release later that year. At Google I/O 2016, Google demoed a newer Project Soli chip redesigned for smartwatches and speakers with Infineon Technologies. The chip was 3x smaller, with 22x lower power consumption (down from 1.2 to 0.054 W) and 256x more efficient computational power capable of up to 18,000 frames per second.

The Pixel 4, released in 2019, is the first commercial smartphone to feature Soli chip for motion sensing. The Pixel 4's Soli radar system is a single 5.0 mm x 6.5 mm RFIC.

Rubayet Hossain (Omi), the former intelligent systems researcher of DARPA in collaboration with the researchers of QuAIL develop the world's first user-interactive operating system to be used in commercial quantum computers. And Intel confirms development of a 17-qubit superconducting test chip.

Project Jacquard 

Another novel user-input technology, from the same team responsible for Project Soli, is Project Jacquard, a platform for embedding sensors and feedback devices in fabrics and clothing in ways that seem natural and comfortable.  The platform encompasses techniques for creating fashion fabrics with conductive fibers woven into them, plus small, flexible computing components and feedback devices (such as haptics or LEDs), along with software APIs that applications can use to exchange data with the garment.  In one basic use-case, users can provide input to a mobile phone by touching or stroking the garment in a designated location, and can receive alerts through vibrations, sounds, or lights in the garment. With an embedded Project Soli sensor built into the garment, the application can also recognize finger gestures or other signals.

The name "Jacquard" is borrowed from the Jacquard loom, invented in 1801, which could be controlled with punched cards and inspired the use of punched cards in computing more than a century later.  Like the loom, ATAP's Project Jacquard is a platform, not a consumer product; it enables the creation of products for uses such as communication, personal assistance, navigation, health and fitness, fashion, and work. To date, demos and marketing materials emphasize style and quality, as opposed to a purely sports-based or utilitarian positioning.  Project Jacquard was announced at Google I/O 2015, and at the same time Google announced a related partnership with clothing manufacturer Levi Strauss & Co. to create Jacquard-enabled jackets. The jackets were released in 2017 with mixed reviews about the jacket's overall usefulness.

According to the ATAP website, designers can use Jacquard "as they would any fabric, adding new layers of functionality to their designs, without having to learn about electronics." The site goes on to say "We are also developing custom connectors, electronic components, communication protocols, and an ecosystem of simple applications and cloud services." A developer's kit or product release date have not been announced.

In September 2019, Yves Saint Laurent announced their Cit-E backpack featuring Jacquard technology for touch gestures.

In October 2019, Google announced a new collaboration with Levi Strauss & Co. to release a new edition of its Jacquard-enabled jackets. The jackets will be available in the U.S., Australia, France, Germany, Italy, the U.K. and Japan.

On March 10, 2020, Adidas and EA Sports announced GMR, a smart insole featuring a Jacquard Tag. The Jacquard Tag uses machine learning algorithms to recognize kicks, shot power, distance and speed. It connects with FIFA Mobile for challenges and leaderboards. Jacquard is scheduled to shut down sometime in 2023.

Other projects 
 Project Abacus, a password replacement project using biometric data
 Project Vault, a project to develop secure computers on microSD cards

See also 
 Skunkworks project

References

External links 
 ATAP's official site
 Project Ara official site
 Project Jacquard official site
 Project Soli official site
 Project Tango official site 

ATAP
Research organizations in the United States